The Pampanga Giant Lanterns, also known as the Pampanga G Lanterns, are a professional basketball team in the Maharlika Pilipinas Basketball League (MPBL) and the Pilipinas Super League (PSL). The team is owned by ADG Group of Companies. with the partnership of the Local Government of Pampanga, Philippines.

History
They joined MPBL during the league's expansion.

Current roster

Head coaches

All-time roster

 Mark Dyke (2018–present)
 Mark Jason T. (2018–present)
 Juneric Baloria (2018–present)
 Daniel De Guzman (2018–present)
 Jerome Ralar (2018–present)
 Aries Tapnio (2018–present)
 Francisco Tapnio (2018–present)
 Jeric Nacpil (2018–present)
 Arvin Tapnio (2018–present)

MPBL records

References

2018 establishments in the Philippines
Basketball teams established in 2018
Maharlika Pilipinas Basketball League teams